The Black Abbot is a 1934 British comedy crime film directed by George A. Cooper and starring John Stuart, Judy Kelly and Edgar Norfolk. It was made at Twickenham Studios as a quota quickie for release by RKO Pictures.

The film's sets were designed by the art director James A. Carter.

Cast
 John Stuart as Frank Brooks  
 Judy Kelly as Sylvia Hillcrest  
 Edgar Norfolk as Brian Heslewood  
 Richard Cooper as Lord Jerry Pilkdown  
 Drusilla Wills as Mary Hillcrist  
 Farren Soutar as John Hillcrist  
 Cyril Smith as Alf Higgins  
 Davina Craig as Jane, the maid  
 Earl Grey as Phillips, the butler  
 Ben Welden as Charlie Marsh  
 John Turnbull as Inspector Lockwood

References

Bibliography
 Low, Rachael. Filmmaking in 1930s Britain. George Allen & Unwin, 1985.
 Wood, Linda. British Films, 1927-1939. British Film Institute, 1986.

External links

1934 films
British crime comedy films
1930s crime comedy films
Films shot at Twickenham Film Studios
Films directed by George A. Cooper
Films set in England
British black-and-white films
1934 comedy films
1930s English-language films
1930s British films
Quota quickies